The following is a list of Solar System objects by orbit, ordered by increasing distance from the Sun. Most named objects in this list have a diameter of 500 km or more.

The Sun, a spectral class G2V main-sequence star
The inner Solar System and the terrestrial planets
Mercury
Mercury-crossing minor planets
Venus
Venus-crossing minor planets
, Venus's quasi-satellite
Earth
Moon
Near-Earth asteroids (including 99942 Apophis)
Earth trojan
Earth-crosser asteroids
Earth's quasi-satellites
Mars
Deimos
Phobos
Mars trojans
Mars-crossing minor planets
Asteroids in the asteroid belt, between the orbits of Mars and Jupiter
Ceres, a dwarf planet
Pallas
Vesta
Hygiea
Asteroids number in the hundreds of thousands. For longer lists, see list of exceptional asteroids, list of asteroids, or list of Solar System objects by size.
Asteroid moons
A number of smaller groups distinct from the asteroid belt
The outer Solar System with the giant planets, their satellites, trojan asteroids and some minor planets
Jupiter
Rings of Jupiter
Complete list of Jupiter's natural satellites
Io
Europa
Ganymede
Callisto
Jupiter trojans
Jupiter-crossing minor planets
Saturn
Rings of Saturn
Complete list of Saturn's natural satellites
Mimas
Enceladus
Tethys (trojans: Telesto and Calypso)
Dione (trojans: Helene and Polydeuces)
Rhea
Rings of Rhea
Titan
Hyperion
Iapetus
Phoebe
Shepherd moons
Saturn-crossing minor planets
Uranus
Rings of Uranus
Complete list of Uranus's natural satellites
Miranda
Ariel
Umbriel
Titania
Oberon
Uranus trojan
Uranus-crossing minor planets
Neptune
Rings of Neptune
Complete list of Neptune's natural satellites
Proteus
Triton
Nereid
Neptune trojans
Neptune-crossing minor planets
Non-trojan minor planets
Centaurs
Damocloids
Trans-Neptunian objects (beyond the orbit of Neptune)
Kuiper-belt objects (KBOs)
Plutinos
Pluto, a dwarf planet
Complete list of Pluto's natural satellites
Charon
90482 Orcus
Vanth
Twotinos
Cubewanos (classical objects)
, a dwarf planet
Namaka
Hiʻiaka
, a dwarf planet
50000 Quaoar
Weywot

120347 Salacia
20000 Varuna
Scattered-disc objects
Eris, a dwarf planet 
Dysnomia
225088 Gonggong
Xiangliu

V774104
Detached objects

90377 Sedna (possibly inner Oort cloud)
 (possibly inner Oort cloud)
Oort cloud (hypothetical)
Hills cloud/inner Oort cloud
Outer Oort cloud

The Solar System also contains:

Comets
List of periodic comets
List of near-parabolic comets
Small objects, including:
Meteoroids
Interplanetary dust
Helium focusing cone, around the Sun
Human-made objects orbiting the Sun, Mercury, Venus, Earth, Mars, and Saturn, including active artificial satellites and space junk
Heliosphere, a bubble in space produced by the solar wind
Heliosheath
Heliopause
Hydrogen wall, a pile up of hydrogen from the interstellar medium

See also 
 Outline of the Solar System
 Lists of astronomical objects
 List of natural satellites
 List of Solar System objects by size
 List of Solar System objects most distant from the Sun
 Ring system
 Solar System models